Ambulyx amara is a species of moth in the family Sphingidae. It was described by Ulf Eitschberger, Andreas Bergmann and Armin Hauenstein in 2006. It is known from Guangdong in China.

References

Ambulyx
Moths described in 2006
Moths of Asia